Parapionus varicolor is a species of beetle belonging to the weevil family Curculionidae. It is the only species in the genus Parapionus, in the tribe Episomini. It is found in the Indian state of Maharashtra.

References 

Curculionidae
Curculionidae genera
Insects of India
Beetles described in 1916
Monotypic beetle genera